Gnidia is a genus of flowering plants in the family Thymelaeaceae. It is distributed in Africa, Madagascar, Arabia, India, and Sri Lanka; more than half of all the species are endemic to South Africa. Gnidia was named for Knidos, an Ancient Greek city located in modern-day Turkey.

These are perennial herbs and shrubs, sometimes with rhizomes. Most species have alternately arranged leaves, and a few have opposite leaves. The leaves are undivided and unlobed. The inflorescence is a head of a few to many flowers. The calyx is cylindrical and the colored lobes may alternate with the petals; some species lack petals. Many species are similar in appearance and difficult to tell apart.

Molecular analyses have provided evidence that the genus is polyphyletic, made up of four different lineages. They are related to the four genera Struthiola, Drapetes, Lasiosiphon, and Pimelea.

There are 140 to 160 species classified in the genus.

Species include:

Gnidia anthylloides
Gnidia burchellii
Gnidia caffra
Gnidia capitata
Gnidia carinata
Gnidia chapmanii
Gnidia chrysantha
Gnidia chrysophylla
Gnidia ericoides
Gnidia fastigiata
Gnidia humilis
Gnidia insignis
Gnidia involucrata
Gnidia kraussiana
Gnidia latifolia
Gnidia microcephala
Gnidia mollis
Gnidia nana
Gnidia ornata
Gnidia pedunculata
Gnidia polycephala
Gnidia razakamalalana
 Gnidia socotrana
Gnidia sonderiana
Gnidia spicata
Gnidia squarrosa
Gnidia usafuae
Gnidia variabilis
Gnidia virescens
Gnidia wickstroemiana

References

External links
Species listing: Gnidia. Red List of South African Plants. South African National Biodiversity Institute (SANBI).

Taxonomy articles created by Polbot
Thymelaeoideae
Malvales genera